Susan Diana Iversen  (born 28 February 1940) is a British experimental psychologist. She is a former Professor of Psychology at the University of Oxford

Early life and education
She attended Girton College, Cambridge. At Cambridge she did a BA in Zoology followed by a PhD in Experimental Psychology.

Career and research
Iversen was a fellow of Girton College, Cambridge, from 1964 to 1975. From 1981 to 1993 she was a fellow of Jesus College, Cambridge. She served as president from 1984 to 1986 of the British Association for Psychopharmacology, which publishes the Journal of Psychopharmacology, and the Experimental Psychology Society from 1988 to 1990.
She was a fellow of Magdalen College, Oxford, from 1993 to 2005, and also professor of psychology. She served as head of the department of Experimental Psychology from 1993 to 2000.

Awards and honours
Iverson was elected a Fellow of the Academy of Medical Sciences (FMedSci) in 1999. She served as editor of Neuropsychologia from 1997 to 2000. She was appointed a Commander of the Order of the British Empire (CBE) in the 2005 New Year Honours.

Personal life
She married Leslie Iversen in 1961. They have a son and a daughter. She is the daughter of Jack and Edith Kibble.

References

1940 births
Alumni of Girton College, Cambridge
British psychologists
Commanders of the Order of the British Empire
Experimental psychologists
Fellows of Girton College, Cambridge
Fellows of Jesus College, Cambridge
Fellows of Magdalen College, Oxford
Fellows of the Academy of Medical Sciences (United Kingdom)
Psychology educators
Psychopharmacologists
Living people